Phoenix Spicer (born 30 January 2002) is an Australian rules footballer playing for the North Melbourne Football Club in the Australian Football League (AFL). Spicer was selected at pick 42 in the 2021 AFL draft from SANFL club, South Adelaide.

An exciting small forward with elite speed and agility, Spicer is capable of breaking the game open with his athletic ability. He recorded an elite 7.80 seconds for the AFL Agility run in SA preseason testing last year but did not test at Draft Combine due to injury. Spicer had a consistent Under-18 season averaging 17.2 disposals (40% contested) in nine matches in 2020.

Early life and junior career
Spicer attended Hamilton Secondary College before transitioning to Henley High School to further his opportunities as a footy player.

In his junior leagues, Spicer played for the Edwardstown Football Club, and later, the Morphettville Park Football Club before playing for South Adelaide in 2020.

AFL career
Spicer made his debut during round 23 of the 2021 AFL season with the Kangaroos playing against the Adelaide Crows in a losing effort in which Phoenix gathered seven disposals.

References

External links 

Living people
2002 births
North Melbourne Football Club players
Indigenous Australian players of Australian rules football
South Adelaide Football Club players
Australian rules footballers from Adelaide